Vision Valley is the third studio album by Australian rock band The Vines. It was released on 1 April 2006 through EMI Records. It is the band's first album without bass guitarist Patrick Matthews who left the band in 2004.

Recording and mixing 

Vision Valley was recorded at Electric Avenue, Velvet Sound, Big Jesus Burger, and NikiNali studios in Sydney, Australia. It was mixed at Velvet Sound and Electric Avenue and it was assisted by Veit Mahler, Jason Lea. At Velvet Sound, it was assisted by Dan Clinch and Anthony The and by Peter Farley and Jodie Wallance at BJB. Vision Valley was mastered by Don Bartley at Studio 301 in Sydney, Australia.

Release 

In the United States, the album debuted at No. 136 on the Billboard 200 chart, selling 7,839 units. Both "Anysound" and "Spaceship" appeared in season 3 of The O.C. in episodes 21 and 24 respectively.

This album has been released with the Copy Control protection system in some regions.

Reception 

The album received generally positive reviews from many critics. Music publications such as Q and NME respectively gave the album 4/5 stars and 7/10. Q had Vision Valley at number 69 in their Albums of 2006 Poll, dubbing the songs "superior grunge anthems". Entertainment Weekly gave the album a positive review and wrote "[Nicholls'] feral, melodic garage punk is refreshing".

In their negative review, Pitchfork wrote "what the Vines offer on their third album is permutations and refinements on what they've been doing since whenever. On the stupid loud songs, Craig Nicholls sounds like a bored Kurt Cobain. On the stupid slow songs, Craig Nicholls sounds like a bored Liam Gallagher (which is pretty impressive, given Gallagher's innate inertia)", though that "there's nothing musically offputting about this record, unless relentless mediocrity in the three-chord arts is a capital crime." Slant Magazine wrote "The Vines ultimately come off as nothing more than a proficient Nirvana cover band, lacking a perspective of their own or a voice that really demands attention." PopMatters wrote "The Vines are polished so shiny by Capitol on their new record you can see yourself in the reflective, glossy black of the CD booklet" and called the album "a straight-ahead album of short, disposable garage-rock." Drowned in Sound wrote "It is rare to stumble across a record that passes through the air as plainly and unobtrusively as this."

Track listing

Limited edition DVD 

 "Highly Evolved"
 "Get Free"
 "Outtathaway"
 "Homesick"
 "Ride"
 "Winning Days"
 "Gross Out"
 "Studio Walkthrough with Wayne Connolly"

Personnel 

 Craig Nicholls – vocals, guitars, keyboards, bass guitar on "Futuretarded"
 Ryan Griffiths – guitars, keys, percussion, backing vocals
 Hamish Rosser – drums, percussion, backing vocals
 Andy Kent (You Am I) – bass guitar
 Tim Kevin (La Huva) – special arrangements, piano, organ
 Nic Dalton – electric mandolin
 Amanda Brown – violin
 Rowan Smith – violin
 Sophie Glasson – cello

Production 

 Wayne Connolly – production, recording, mixing
 Dan Clinch – additional engineering
 Anthony The – additional engineering
 Veit Mahler – additional engineering

Charts

References

External links 
 Podcast of the band talking about Vision Valley (with samples of "Anysound", "Nothin's Comin", "Vision Valley", "Don't Listen to the Radio", "Gross Out", "Going Gone", "Futuretarded", and "Spaceship".) Originally released on 9 March 2006. In order to watch the podcast, a program called StuffIt is required to expand the file.

2006 albums
The Vines (band) albums
EMI Records albums